Joe Byrne (born 29 November 1953) is a Social Democratic and Labour Party (SDLP) politician, who was a  Member of the Northern Ireland Assembly (MLA) for West Tyrone between 1998 and 2003, and again from 2011 to 2015.

Political biography
After studying economics at Queen's University Belfast, Byrne became a college lecturer. He also joined the Social Democratic and Labour Party (SDLP), and in 1993 was elected to Omagh District Council, becoming Chairman in 1997.

In 1996, Byrne was elected to the Northern Ireland Forum representing West Tyrone. He was appointed to the Northern Ireland Policing Board and was only 1,161 votes away from taking the Westminster seat of West Tyrone at the 1997 general election.

He held his seat at the 1998 Northern Ireland Assembly election, but was not re-elected in 2003. In 2005, he also lost his seat on the Council. In 2009, he was appointed Chairperson of the SDLP and was re-elected to the Northern Ireland Assembly in May 2011.

References

Living people
Alumni of Queen's University Belfast
Members of Omagh District Council
Members of the Northern Ireland Forum
Northern Ireland MLAs 1998–2003
Northern Ireland MLAs 2011–2016
Social Democratic and Labour Party MLAs
1953 births